Inverkeithing railway station serves the town of Inverkeithing in Fife, Scotland. The station is popular with commuters travelling to Edinburgh from Fife and beyond, thanks to its location beside the M90 motorway. Immediately north of the station, the Fife Circle Line splits in two - the main line continuing along the coast via  whilst the branch heads inland towards Dunfermline. South of Inverkeithing the line continues towards Edinburgh via the Forth Bridge.

History
It opened in 1877, at the same time as the tracks of the Dunfermline and Queensferry Railway. In the 1880s it was taken over by the North British Railway, and reopened in 1890 as a more significant double-track station on the approach to the newly built Forth Bridge.

Facilities
Two large free of charge park and ride car parks are provided. The station is currently staffed for all trains and has public toilets and a wheelchair accessible footbridge. The ticket office is located in a modern station building on the northbound platform, while a traditional North British Railway building survives on the southbound platform, where it serves as a waiting room.

Services
Some services between Edinburgh and  also stop at Inverkeithing.

Mondays to Saturdays daytimes, four Fife Circle Line trains per hour go southbound to Edinburgh. Evenings and Sundays, two trains per hour go southbound to Edinburgh and two per hour go along the Fife Circle one in each direction (one via Dunfermline and one via Kirkcaldy).

From Monday to Saturday most daytime ScotRail services to Aberdeen and Inverness no longer stop here (though a few calls are made to both destinations in the early morning & evening). The primary longer distance service is provided by half-hourly semi-fast trains from Edinburgh to either Perth or Dundee (hourly to each), which serve most stations north of Kirkcaldy. There is a once daily train to  via Winchburgh Junction and  each morning, returning in the evening peak.  On Sundays, there is a limited service to Perth & Inverness and a mostly hourly service to Dundee and Aberdeen.

London North Eastern Railway services between Aberdeen, London King's Cross and Leeds call at Inverkeithing.

References

External links

Bus service to Edinburgh Airport
Video footage of Inverkeithing railway station

Railway stations in Fife
Former North British Railway stations
Railway stations in Great Britain opened in 1877
Railway stations served by ScotRail
Railway stations served by Caledonian Sleeper
Railway stations served by London North Eastern Railway
1877 establishments in Scotland
Inverkeithing